Austrian Uruguayans are people born in Austria who live in Uruguay or Uruguayan-born people of Austrian descent.

Overview
In the times of the Austro-Hungarian Empire diplomatic relations were established with Uruguay, with Baron Anton von Petz celebrating a Treaty of Friendship, Trade and Navigation between both countries, which enabled immigration

During the two World Wars thousands of Austrians escaped Europe, most of them fleeing to South America, including a small but significant Austrian-Jewish community. The Central Austrian Committee for Latin America was established in Montevideo in 1943.

The 2011 Uruguayan census revealed 141 people who declared Austria as their country of birth.

There are some members of the Austrian nobility in Uruguay, such as the Auerspergs.

There is an institution, the Alpine Club Montevideo, which was established in 1934 by Austrians and Germans.

Notable Austrian Uruguayans 
 Nelly Weissel (1920–2010), actress
 Carlos Kalmar (born 1958), conductor

See also
Austria–Uruguay relations
Immigration to Uruguay
German Uruguayans
Hungarians in Uruguay

References

External links

 Austrian expats in Uruguay 

Uruguay
Ethnic groups in Uruguay
Immigration to Uruguay
Austria–Uruguay relations
European Uruguayan